Trilogy is a software company based in Austin, Texas. It specializes in software products to Global 1000 companies, especially in the automotive, consumer electronics, and insurance agencies. It was founded by Stanford dropout Joe Liemandt.  Trilogy has additional offices in Bangalore and Hangzhou.  Its clients include Ford Motor Company, Daimler-Chrysler, Nissan, Goodyear, Prudential, Travelers Insurance, Gateway, and IBM.

Trilogy was a 90's pioneer of two new categories of enterprise software: config-price-quote (CPQ) software, which allowed distributed sales forces to accurately quote and configure complex solutions such as mainframes, central office switches, airplanes, and automobiles; and sales compensation software, which allowed sales leaders and HR teams to move sales commissions from spreadsheets to a software database and workflow engine.

Trilogy was featured in the October 1998 Rolling Stone article "Wooing the Geeks". Trilogy is notable for its Trilogy University program, which was the topic of the April 2001 Harvard Business Review article "No Ordinary Boot Camp."

Trilogy built a 2000 person company primarily through college recruiting.  At its peak hiring year, Trilogy hired over 300 college grads into the business.  Given the quality of young talent that Trilogy hired throughout the 90s, the alumni have become a well known tech "mafia" with Trilogy alumni going on to found or lead (as CEO) such companies as Nutanix, Shape Security, Sendgrid, Carta, Stella and Dot, Mozilla, Quizlet, Indeed, Tinder, Exahop, Zocdoc, Extend Fertility, and Vertica.

Subsidiaries
In February 2006, Trilogy acquired Versata.

In July 2006, Trilogy acquired Artemis International Solutions Corporation, a supplier of project and product portfolio management tools, including Artemis (software). Versata operates as a wholly owned subsidiary of Trilogy, Inc.

In October 2012, Trilogy acquired four Progress Software businesses – Sonic, Savvion, Actional and DXSI - and created a new company called Aurea Software.

Trilogy Insurance is a wholly owned subsidiary of Trilogy.

References

External links
 Trilogy
 Trilogy Insurance Services
 Insanity Inc.
 Joe Liemandt lecture for Entrepreneurial Thought Leaders (Stanford)

Companies based in Austin, Texas
Companies established in 1989
Software companies based in Texas
Software companies of the United States